Simon III (born after 1330; died 30 August 1414) was a German nobleman of the House of Sponheim and the last ruling count from the Sponheim-Kreuznach line.

House of Sponheim
14th-century births
1414 deaths
Counts of Germany